The Roman Catholic Archdiocese of Diamantina is an archdiocese located in the city of Diamantina, Minas Gerais in Brazil.

History
 June 6, 1854: Established as Diocese of Diamantina from the Diocese of Mariana
 June 28, 1917: Promoted as Metropolitan Archdiocese of Diamantina

Special churches
Minor Basilicas:
 Basílica Sagrado Coração de Jesus, Diamantina
 Basílica São Geraldo Majela, Curvelo

Bishops

Ordinaries, in reverse chronological order
 Archbishops of Diamantina (Roman rite)
 Archbishop Darci José Nicioli (2016.03.09 - Present)
 Archbishop João Bosco Oliver de Faria (2007.05.30 – 2016.03.09)
 Archbishop Paulo Lopes de Faria (1997.05.14 – 2007.05.30)
 Archbishop Geraldo Majela Reis (1981.02.03 – 1997.05.14)
 Archbishop Geraldo de Proença Sigaud, S.V.D. (1960.12.20 – 1980.09.10)
 Archbishop José Newton de Almeida Baptista (1954.01.05 – 1960.03.12)
 Archbishop Serafim Gomes Jardim da Silva (1934.05.26 – 1953.10.28)
 Archbishop Joaquim Silvério de Souza (1917.06.28 – 1933.08.30)
 Bishops of Diamantina (Roman Rite) 
 Archbishop (personal title) Joaquim Silvério de Souza (1910.01.25 – 1917.06.28)
 Bishop Joaquim Silvério de Souza (later Archbishop) (1905.05.05 – 1909.01.29)
 Bishop João Antônio dos Santos (1863.09.28 – 1905.05.17)

Coadjutor bishops
Joaquim Silvério de Souza (1901-1905)
Paulo Lopes de Faria (1995-1997)

Auxiliary bishops
Antônio José dos Santos, C.M. (1918-1929), appointed Bishop of Assis, São Paulo 
Carlos Carmelo de Vasconcellos Motta (1932-1935), appointed Archbishop of São Luís do Maranhão; future Cardinal
João de Souza Lima, O. Cist. (1949-1955), appointed Bishop of Nazaré, Pernambuco

Other priests of this diocese who became bishops
Cyrillo de Paula Freitas, appointed Coadjutor Bishop of Cuiabá in 1905
João Antônio Pimenta, appointed Coadjutor Bishop of São Pedro do Rio Grande do Sul in 1906
Lúcio Antunes de Souza, appointed Bishop of Botucatu in 1908
Nunes de Ávila e Silva, appointed Bishop of Taubaté, São Paulo in 1909
João de Almeida Ferrão (Terra), appointed Bishop of Campanha, Minas Gerais in 1909
Manuel Nunes Coelho, appointed Bishop of Aterrado in 1920
José André Coimbra, appointed Bishop of Barra do Piraí in 1938
Serafim Fernandes de Araújo, appointed Auxiliary Bishop of Belo Horizonte, Minas Gerais in 1959; future Cardinal
Leonardo de Miranda Pereira, appointed Bishop of Paracatu, Minas Gerais in 1986
José Aristeu Vieira, appointed Bishop of Luz, Minas Gerais in 2015
Lindomar Rocha Mota, appointed Bishop of São Luís de Montes Belos, Goias in 2020

Suffragan dioceses
 Diocese of Almenara 
 Diocese of Araçuaí
 Diocese of Guanhães
 Diocese of Teófilo Otoni

References

Sources
 GCatholic.org
 Catholic Hierarchy
 Archdiocese website (Portuguese)

Roman Catholic dioceses in Brazil
Roman Catholic ecclesiastical provinces in Brazil
 
Religious organizations established in 1854
Roman Catholic dioceses and prelatures established in the 19th century
1854 establishments in Brazil